

15th Cabinet

Secretaries

Former Secretaries

16th Cabinet

Secretaries

Cabinet-level officers

Governor's Advisory Board

Government-owned corporations

Other agencies

Resignations
 July 19, 2013: Javier Ferrer resigns as President of the Government Development Bank.
 September 13, 2013: Francisco Joglar Pesquera resigns to his position as Secretary of Health amidst controversy on how he managed an outbreak of the bacteria acinetobacter baumannii at the University of Puerto Rico at Carolina hospital.
 May 18, 2014: Carlos del Valle, executive director of the Puerto Rico National Parks, dies in a car accident while driving under the influence.
 September 19, 2014: Ingrid Vila Biaggi resigns to her position as Chief of Staff. Víctor Suárez is appointed in her stead.

17th Cabinet

Secretaries
The Secretaries are the heads of the executive departments of the government of Puerto Rico.

Cabinet-level officers

Other agencies

Notes

References

Cabinet
Cabinet-level officers of the Cabinet of Puerto Rico